Anderton is a civil parish in the Borough of Chorley, Lancashire, England.  It contains twelve buildings that are recorded in the National Heritage List for England as designated listed buildings, all of which are listed at Grade II.  This grade is the lowest of the three gradings given to listed buildings and is applied to "buildings of national importance and special interest".  The parish is mainly rural, with its northern part containing residential areas linking with the town of Adlington.  The listed buildings reflect the agricultural history of the parish, with nine of them being farmhouses or farm buildings.  The other listed buildings are a portion of a medieval cross, the remains of a set of stocks, and a house from the early 20th century.

Buildings

References

Citations

Sources

Lists of listed buildings in Lancashire
Buildings and structures in the Borough of Chorley